The tenth season of Indonesian Idol premiered on RCTI on October 7, 2019, after a year hiatus and ended on March 2, 2020, coinciding with the early rise of COVID-19 pandemic in Indonesia. The main audition process was held in five major cities in Indonesia: Bandung, Yogyakarta, Surabaya, Medan and Jakarta. This season marks as the first season to have an all-female Top 3 in Indonesian Idol history, and the second season to have an all-female finale since season 7. The winner of the season was 16-year-old Lyodra Ginting, who became the fourth female Indonesian Idol winner in a row since season 7.

Hosts and judges

Host & Co-host 
 Daniel Mananta
 Sere Kalina

Judges  
The judges were :
 Ari Lasso
 Anang Hermansyah
 Bunga Citra Lestari
 Judika
 Maia Estianty

Schedule auditions

Regional auditions

Terms contestants: Contestants must be 16–27 years old and lived in Indonesia

Elimination round
The first day of the elimination round featured the 113 contestants from the auditions round singing solo a cappella. 51 contestants advanced. The next round required the contestants to split up into 10 groups and perform the same song. 31 of them advanced to the finals of the elimination round requiring a solo performance with a full band. 23 of them made it to the Top 23 show where the judges take contestants one by one and tell them if they made the final 23.

Semi-finals

Showcase Round
The top 22 Show was divided into two nights and aired live on 4 and 5 November 2019 at 9:00 p.m. The contestants performed songs of their choice (there was no particular theme) with thirteen contestants performed on the first night, and the other performed on the second night along with the result. Ten contestants with most vote advanced automatically to the Spectacular Show, and then each judges would pick one contestant left to compete along the Top 10. There were 22 semi-finalists, thirteen females and nine males.

Showcase Round 1 (4 November 2019)

Showcase Round 2 (5 November 2019)

Elimination chart

References

External links
 

Indonesian Idol
2019 Indonesian television seasons
2020 Indonesian television seasons